Mark Teltscher is an English poker player, based in London, England. He was the winner of the 2005 European Poker Tour London leg.

Live poker
In September 2005, Teltscher won the £3,000 no limit Texas hold 'em main event of the European Poker Tour's second season event in London, taking home the £280,000 first prize.

Three months later, Teltscher won the $5,000 event at the Five Diamond World Poker Classic in Las Vegas, earning a further $374,965, defeating a field that included World Poker Tour winners Michael Mizrachi, Gavin Smith and Alan Goehring.

As of 2018, his total live tournament winnings exceed $4,709,040.

References

Poker players from London
European Poker Tour winners
Living people
People from Mayfair
Year of birth missing (living people)